Kōtal-e Khushk, also called Ąaćbaną and Kōtal-e Darband, is a mountain pass in Daykundi Province, central Afghanistan.

References

Mountain passes of Afghanistan
Landforms of Daykundi Province